Ronald James Gibbs (born November 27, 1947, in Sampaloc, Manila, Philippines), popularly known by his on-screen name Ronaldo Valdez, is a veteran Filipino film and television actor whose career spanned for almost five decades.

Valdez is the father of actor-comedian, TV host and singer Janno Gibbs and Melissa Gibbs. He is married to Maria Fe Gibbs. Valdez started his earlier career as a leading man and is currently known for portraying paternal roles and antagonists in both TV and film. He is also the first KFC Filipino Colonel.

He was discovered by Dolphy in the mid 1960s before doing many films in the 70s he has gained popularity playing important father roles, and Rich Father figures he has also been notable to new audiences in shows like Los Bastardos in 2018-2019 and the series 2 Good 2 Be True in 2022-2023

Filmography

Television

Film

 Annie B. (2004)
 Trip (2001)
 Pedro Penduko, Episode II: The Return of the Comeback (2000)
 Oo na... Mahal na kung mahal (1999)
 Tik Tak Toys: My Kolokotoys (1999)
 Nagbibinata (1998)
 Sa sandaling kailangan mo ako (1998)
 Ben Delubyo (1998)
 Roberta (1997)
 Nasaan ang puso (1997) .
 Iskalawag (1997)
 Isinakdal ko ang aking ina (1997)
 Ambisyosa (1997) – Mr. Frank Larkins
 Hanggang kailan kita mamahalin? (1997)
 Kulayan natin ang bukas (1997)
 Ikaw pala ang mahal ko (1997)
 Ipaglaban mo: The Movie (1996)
 Virgin People 2 (1996)
 Cedie (1996) as The Earl of Dorincourt
 Tubusin mo ng bala ang puso ko (1996)
 The Flor Contemplacion Story (1995)
 Campus Girls (1995)
 Kapitan Tumba: The Capt. Jose Huevos Story (1995)
 I love you sabado the movie (1995)
 Biboy Banal: Pagganti Ko Tapos Kayo! (1994)
 Muntik na kitang minahal (1994)
 Padre Amante Guerrero (1993)
 May minamahal (1993)
 Tumbasan mo ng buhay (1993)
 Adan Ronquillo: Tubong Cavite... laking Tondo (1993) .... Moreno
 Abel Morado: Ikaw ang may sala (1993)
 Rosang Tattoo (1992)
 Estribo Gang: The Jinggoy Sese Story (1992)
 Batas Ko Ang Iiral (1992)
 Sa kabila ng lahat (1991)
 Joey Boy Munti, 15 anyos ka sa Muntilupa (1991)
 May Araw Ka Lang Sa Lahi mo! Belaro (1990) .... Apollo San Vicente
 Bad Boy (1990) .... Rustico
 Kolehiyala (1990)
 Kakampi Ko ang Diyos (1990)
 Hot Summer (1990)
 Huwag kang hahalik sa diablo (1989)
 Lady L (1989)
 Bukas, Sisikat Din Ang Araw (1988)
 Bunsong kerubin (1987)
 Napakasakit, kuya Eddie (1986)
 Deadly Target (1986)
 Huwag mo kaming isumpa (1986)
 Laban kung Laban (1986)
 Mga nakaw na sandali (1986)
 Turuang apoy (1985)
 Miguelito: Batang Rebelde (1985)
 Heartache City (1985)
 Bomba Queen (1985)
 Lalakwe (1985)
 Kapag baboy ang inutang (1985)
 Apoy sa iyong kandungan (1985)
 Montemayor: Tulisang dagat (1984)
 May daga sa labas ng lungga (1984)
 Kaya kong abutin ang langit (1984)
 Palabra de honor (1983)
 M.I.B.: Men in Brief (1983)
 Pedring Taruc (1982)
 Dear Heart (1981)
 Ang Kabiyak (1981)
 Mahinhin vs. Mahinhin (1981)
 Langis at tubig (1980)
 Kanto boy (1980)
 Iskandalo! (1979)
 Ikaw at ang gabi (1979)
 Sari-saring ibong kulasisi (1978)
 Babae... ngayon at kailanman (1977)
 Electrika Kasi, Eh! (1977)
 Tatlong kasalanan (1976)
 Langit, Lupa at Impiyerno (1976)
 Banaue (1975)
 Niño Valiente (1975)
 Daigdig ng sindak at lagim (1974)
 Kayod sa umaga, kayod sa gabi (1974)
 Magsikap: Kayod sa araw, kayod sa gabi (1974)
 Dalawa ang nagdalantao sa akin (1974)
 Paruparong itim (1973)
 Kung bakit dugo ang kulay ng gabi (1973)
 Roulette (1972)
 Pagdating sa dulo (1971)
 Lilet (1971)
 Daluyong! (1971)
 Pigilin mo ang umaga (1971)
 Brownout (1969)
 Eskinita 29 (1968)
 Giyera patani (1968)
 Kaming Taga-ilog (1968)
 Mad Doctor of Blood Island (1968)
 Bang-shang-a-lang (1968)
 Kaming taga bundok (1968)
 Brainwash (1968)
 Sitsiritsit Alibangbang: Salaginto at Salagubang (1967)
 Hangganan ng matatapang (1967)
 The Jukebox Queen (1966)
 Mariang kondesa (1966)
 Pepe en Pilar (1966)

See also
Janno Gibbs
List of Filipino actors

Awards and nominations

Notes

External links
 

GMA Network personalities
Filipino people of American descent
Filipino male comedians
Filipino male film actors
Living people
1947 births
ABS-CBN personalities
People from Sampaloc, Manila
Male actors from Manila
Filipino male television actors
Filipino male models